Unión Montañesa Escobedo is a Spanish football team based in Escobedo, Camargo, in the autonomous community of Cantabria. Founded in 1964 it plays in Tercera División RFEF – Group 3, holding home matches at Estadio Eusebio Arce.

History
Escobedo was founded in 1964. The team played in the regional leagues for the vast majority of its first 26 years, with the one exception being a season-long stay in Tercera División in 1967–68.

The team returned to the category, now the national fourth division, twenty-one years later, remaining there for the subsequent decades. In 1991–92 and the following campaigns it was crowned division champions, adding four runner-up places; however, none of the ten promotion playoff visits to Segunda División B was successful.

Escobedo reached the third round of the Copa del Rey in 1991–92, falling to CD Málaga 0–3 on aggregate. Two years later the club qualified to the same stage, losing over two legs to UE Lleida.

On 28 September 2017, Escobedo achieved its first regional tournament by winning the Cantabrian stage of the Copa Federación after beating Cayón by a huge 3–0 in the final. In the 2018-19 season the club won Group 3 of the Tercera División.

Season to season

33 seasons in Tercera División
1 season in Tercera División RFEF

Stadium
Escobedo's home ground is the Estadio Eusebio Arce, around a mile west of Muriedas, the capital of Camargo. It has a capacity of 2,000 seats with a low, cantilevered stand that runs the length of the pitch on the north side of the enclosure. The stand also houses the players changing facilities, club offices and a social club.

References

External links
Futbolme team profile 
Pueblo con Encanto profile 

Football clubs in Cantabria
Association football clubs established in 1964
1964 establishments in Spain